A Member of the Legislative Assembly (MLA) is a representative elected by the voters of an electoral district (constituency) to the legislature of State government in the Indian system of government. From each constituency, the people elect one representative who then becomes a member of the Legislative Assembly (MLA). Each state has between seven and nine MLAs for every Member of Parliament (MP) that it has in the Lok Sabha, the lower house of India's bicameral parliament. There are also members in three unicameral legislatures in Union Territories: the Delhi Legislative Assembly, Jammu and Kashmir Legislative Assembly and the Puducherry Legislative Assembly. Only a Member of the Legislative Assembly can work as a minister for more than 6 months. If a non-Member of the Legislative Assembly becomes a Chief Minister or a minister, he must become an MLA within 6 months to continue in the job. Only a Member of the Legislative Assembly can become a Speaker of the Legislature.

Introduction 
In states where there are two houses, there is a State Legislative Council, and a State Legislative Assembly. In such a case, the Legislative Council is the upper house, while the Legislative Assembly is the lower house of the state legislature.

The Governor shall not be a member of the Legislature or Parliament, shall not hold any office of profit, and shall be entitled to emoluments and allowances. (Article 158 of the Indian constitution).

The Legislative Assembly consists of not more than 500 members and not fewer than 60. The biggest state, Uttar Pradesh, has 403 members in its Assembly. States which have small populations and are small in size have a provision for having an even smaller number of members in the Legislative Assembly. Puducherry has 33 members out of which 3 are nominated by central government. Mizoram and Goa have only 40 members each. Sikkim has 32. All members of the Legislative Assembly are elected based on adult franchise, and one member is elected from one constituency. Until January 2020, the President had the power to nominate two Anglo Indians to the Lok Sabha and the Governor had the power to nominate one member from the Anglo Indian community deems fit if the governor thinks that they are not adequately represented in the Assembly. In January 2020, the Anglo-Indian reserved seats in the Parliament and State legislatures of India were abolished by the 104th Constitutional Amendment Act, 2019.

Nominated MLAs in states and UTs 
Up to three MLAs can be nominated in the union territory of Puducherry by the central government who enjoy equal powers as elected MLAs.

Qualification
The qualifications to become a member of the Legislative Assembly are largely similar to the qualifications to be a member of Parliament.

 The person should be a citizen of India.
 Not less than 25 years of age to be a member of the Legislative Assembly and not less than 30 years (as per Article 173 of Indian Constitution) to be a member of the Legislative Council.
 No person can become a member of the Legislative Assembly or the Legislative Council of any state unless the individual is a voter from any constituency of the state. Those who cannot become members of Parliament also cannot become members of the state legislature.
 The person should not be convicted of any offence and sentenced to imprisonment of 2 years or more.

Term

The term of the Legislative Assembly is five years. However, it may be dissolved earlier than that by the Governor at the request of the Chief Minister, when the Chief Minister has actual majority support in the Assembly. The Assembly may be dissolved earlier if no one can prove majority support and become Chief Minister. The term of the Legislative Assembly may be extended during an emergency, but not more than six months at a time. The Legislative Council is the upper house of the State. Just like the Rajya Sabha, it is a permanent House. The members of the state's upper house are selected based on the strength of each party in the lower house and by state gubernatorial nomination. The term is six years, and a third of the members of the House retire after every two years. The upper house of a state assembly, unlike the upper house of the Parliament, can be abolished by the lower house, if it passes a specific law bill, which states to dissolve the upper house, and gets it attested in both houses of parliament and then signed by the president into law. Only Andhra Pradesh, Bihar, Karnataka, Maharashtra, Telangana, and Uttar Pradesh have their upper houses in existence with a six-year term. All other states have abolished the upper house by the above-mentioned method, as the upper house causes unnecessary problems, expenditures and issues.

Powers
The most important function of the legislature is law-making. The state legislature has the power to make laws on all items on which Parliament cannot legislate. Some of these items are police, prisons, irrigation, agriculture, local governments, public health, Pilgrimage, and burial grounds. Some topics on which both Parliament and states can make laws are education, marriage and divorce, forests, and the protection of wild animals and birds.

As regards money bills, the position is the same. Bills can originate only in the Legislative Assembly. The Legislative Council can either pass the bill within 14 days of the date of the receipt of the Bill or suggest changes to it within 14 days. These changes may or may not be accepted by the Assembly.

The state legislature, besides making laws, has one electoral power, in electing the President of India. Elected members of the Legislative Assembly along with the elected members of Parliament are involved in this process.

Some parts of the Constitution can be amended by Parliament with the approval of half of the state legislatures. Thus the state legislatures take part in the process of amendment to the Constitution.

MLAs by States 
Members of Legislative Assembly by their political party

MLAs by party affiliation

See also 
 Election Commission of India
2022 elections in India
List of members of the 17th Lok Sabha
Member of the Legislative Assembly
List of current members of the Rajya Sabha
Rajya Sabha

References

Members of the state Legislative Assemblies of India